In mathematics, there are two different results that share the common name of the Ky Fan inequality.  One is an inequality involving the geometric mean and arithmetic mean of two sets of real numbers of the unit interval. The result was published on page 5 of the book Inequalities by Edwin F. Beckenbach and Richard E. Bellman (1961), who refer to an unpublished result of Ky Fan. They mention the result in connection with the inequality of arithmetic and geometric means and Augustin Louis Cauchy's proof of this inequality by forward-backward-induction; a method which can also be used to prove the Ky Fan inequality.

This Ky Fan inequality is a special case of Levinson's inequality and also the starting point for several generalizations and refinements; some of them are given in the references below.

The second Ky Fan inequality is used in game theory to investigate the existence of an equilibrium.

Statement of the classical version

with equality if and only if x1 = x2 = · · · = xn.

Remark
Let

denote the arithmetic and geometric mean, respectively, of x1, . . ., xn, and let

denote the arithmetic and geometric mean, respectively, of 1 − x1, . . ., 1 − xn. Then the Ky Fan inequality can be written as

which shows the similarity to the inequality of arithmetic and geometric means given by Gn ≤ An.

Generalization with weights
If xi ∈ [0,½] and γi ∈ [0,1] for i = 1, . . ., n are real numbers satisfying γ1 + . . . + γn = 1, then

with the convention 00 := 0. Equality holds if and only if either
γixi = 0 for all i = 1, . . ., n or
all xi > 0 and there exists x ∈ (0,½] such that x = xi for all i = 1, . . ., n with γi > 0.

The classical version corresponds to γi = 1/n for all i = 1, . . ., n.

Proof of the generalization
Idea: Apply Jensen's inequality to the strictly concave function

Detailed proof: (a) If at least one xi is zero, then the left-hand side of the Ky Fan inequality is zero and the inequality is proved. Equality holds if and only if the right-hand side is also zero, which is the case when γixi = 0 for all i = 1, . . ., n.

(b) Assume now that all xi > 0. If there is an i with γi = 0, then the corresponding xi > 0 has no effect on either side of the inequality, hence the ith term can be omitted. Therefore, we may assume that γi > 0 for all i in the following. If x1 = x2 = . . . = xn, then equality holds. It remains to show strict inequality if not all xi are equal.

The function f is strictly concave on (0,½], because we have for its second derivative

Using the functional equation for the natural logarithm and Jensen's inequality for the strictly concave f, we obtain that

where we used in the last step that the γi sum to one. Taking the exponential of both sides gives the Ky Fan inequality.

The Ky Fan inequality in game theory

A second inequality is also called the Ky Fan Inequality, because of a 1972 paper, "A minimax inequality and its applications". This second inequality is equivalent to the Brouwer Fixed Point Theorem, but is often more convenient. This Ky Fan Inequality is used to establish the existence of equilibria in various games studied in economics.

References

External links

Inequalities
Articles containing proofs